Disodium methyl arsonate (DSMA) is the organoarsenic compound with the formula CH3AsO3Na2.  It is a colorless, water-soluble solid derived from methanearsonic acid.  It is used as a herbicide.  Tradenames include Metharsinat, Arrhenal, Disomear, Metharsan, Stenosine, Tonarsan, Tonarsin, Arsinyl, Arsynal, and Diarsen.

The EPA states that all forms of arsenic are a serious risk to human health and the United States' Agency for Toxic Substances and Disease Registry ranked arsenic as number 1 in its 2001 Priority List of Hazardous Substances at Superfund sites. Arsenic is classified as a Group-A carcinogen. The EPA states that:

The EPA also states that, while contaminated soil poses a serious risk to health, arsenic frequently mobilizes from soils and other sources, ending up in water where it is even more of a toxicity issue.

See also
 Cacodylic acid
 Monosodium methyl arsenate

References

Arsenical herbicides
Sodium compounds
Organoarsenic compounds